This is a list of episodes from the eighth and final season of Barnaby Jones.

Broadcast history
The season originally aired Thursdays at 10:00-11:00 pm (EST) from September 20 to November 29, 1979 and at 9:00-10:00 pm (EST) from December 20, 1979 to April 3, 1980.

Episodes

Barnaby Jones (season 8)|Season 8